Salvador Cabrera Aguirre (born 21 August 1973) is a Mexican former professional footballer who played as a defensive midfielder.

Club career
A defensive midfielder also capable of lining up at the back, Cabrera made his debut with Necaxa during the club's title-winning 1994–95 season. He also appeared in the club's successful championship defense the following year, but only became a regular starter during the Invierno 1997 season. During the Invierno 1998 season, Cabrera won his third championship and his first as a major contributor, scoring the championship-winning goal in the final with a long-range shot against Chivas. He joined Atlante in 2001 but returned to Necaxa in 2002, helping the club to a place in the Verano 2002 final. Afterward Necaxa fell into decline, and Cabrera's role began to diminish by the middle of the decade. His last top-flight appearances for the club came in the Clausura 2007 tournament.

Cabrera also participated for Necaxa in international club events. He appeared in the final of the 1999 CONCACAF Champions' Cup, which Necaxa won against LD Alajuelense of Costa Rica. In addition, Cabrera participated in the 2000 FIFA Club World Cup, where Necaxa finished in third place, and scored in the game against South Melbourne FC.

International career
He also earned 10 caps for the Mexico national team, all of them under the direction of former Necaxa coach Manuel Lapuente. Cabrera's first cap came in Los Angeles on February 10, 1999, against Argentina. He made one appearance at the 1999 Copa América, replacing Gerardo Torrado in a 3–1 victory over Venezuela on July 6. Cabrera's last cap came at the 2000 CONCACAF Gold Cup on February 20, 2000, when Mexico was eliminated from the tournament in a 2-1 golden goal defeat against Canada.

Honours
Necaxa
Mexican Primera División: 1994–95, 1995–96, Invierno 1998
Copa México: 1994–95
Campeón de Campeones: 1995
CONCACAF Champions' Cup: 1999
CONCACAF Cup Winners Cup: 1994

References

External links 

1973 births
Living people
Footballers from Mexico City
Association football midfielders
Association football defenders
Mexico international footballers
1999 Copa América players
2000 CONCACAF Gold Cup players
Club Necaxa footballers
Irapuato F.C. footballers
Atlante F.C. footballers
Club Puebla players
Pachuca Juniors footballers
Dorados de Sinaloa footballers
Mexican footballers